The Girl from Steel City is an Australian television series which first screened on SBS in 1987. The series was the first continuing drama series on SBS.

Synopsis
The Girl From Steel City told the story of Stacey Maniatis, a Greek-Australian girl living in Wollongong, who was determined to have a career as a singer. The second series saw Stacey move from Wollongong to Sydney to further her career as a singer but then became an investigative journalist.

Production
The series was mostly in English but contained some Greek dialogue with English subtitles. It was written by Angelo Loukakis, directed by Peter Andrikidis and produced by John Martin and Colin Baker. Music was produced by Tony Karras. The first season consisted of 15 episodes and the second season consisted of 8 episodes.

Cast 
 Elli Hart as Stacey
 Jim Spyridopoulos as Vag
 Michael Garifalakis as Yannis
 Nancy Caruana as Katerina
 Stan Kouros as Con
 Grace Parr as Helen
 Eric Oldfield
 Raina Mckeon
 Sheree Da Costa
 Thalia Caruana

See also 
 List of Australian television series

References

External links 
 The Girl From Steel City series 1 - The Screen Guide - Screen Australia
 The Girl From Steel City series 2 - The Screen Guide - Screen Australia

Australian drama television series
Special Broadcasting Service original programming
1987 Australian television series debuts
1988 Australian television series endings
Television shows set in New South Wales